
Eliza is an American fashion magazine founded in 2007 by Summer Bellessa, who was a Ford Model at that time. The publication is headquartered in Los Angeles, California, and began with a circulation (based on its print run) of 10,000 in 2007. The publishing schedule is now irregular and the magazine is only available digitally and by print-on-demand via HP MagCloud. The magazine's name is a reference to Audrey Hepburn's performance as Eliza Doolittle in My Fair Lady.

Overview
The magazine describes itself as being "for women who want to be stylish, sexy, and engaged in the world while retaining high standards in dress, entertainment, and lifestyle." Founder Summer Bellessa has been described as a leader in the modesty movement.

Criticism
Some critics have called Eliza's focus on modest clothes and its editorial stance "prudish and old-fashioned."

References

External links
 
 
 

Fashion magazines published in the United States
Magazines established in 2007
Magazines published in Los Angeles
Women's fashion magazines
Women's magazines published in the United States